John Keracher (16 January 1880 – 11 January 1958) was a Scottish-born American Marxist politician who founded the Proletarian Party of America in 1920.

Biography

Early years

John Keracher was born on January 16, 1880, in Dundee, Scotland. In his early twenties, Keracher left Scotland for England, where he lived for a number of years. He emigrated to the United States in 1909, settling in Detroit.

In Detroit, Keracher was the proprietor of the Reliance Shoe House, a retail shoe store located at 112 Dix Avenue.

Political career

In April 1910 Keracher joined the Socialist Party of America.

Keracher was an extremely orthodox Marxist who specialized on expositions of Marx's Das Kapital, particularly on the topics of value and surplus-value, as well as the doctrine of historical materialism.  Keracher believed in the primacy of Marxist education of the working class to prepare them for governance upon the inevitable assumption of power through socialist revolution. This program took shape through the formation of a number of local "Proletarian Clubs," later united under the banner of the "Proletarian University," the proto-party organization headed by Keracher.

After the Russian Bolshevik Revolution of 1917, Keracher and his followers became more and more aligned with the Bolsheviks and he was eventually expelled from the Socialist Party of America along with the rest of the Socialist Party of Michigan in May 1919.

Keracher was a delegate to the June 1919 National Conference of the Left Wing in New York City, called by the organized Left Wing Section of the Socialist Party. He attended this meeting together with four other delegates from the Socialist Party of Michigan: Oakley C. Johnson, Dennis Batt, Al Renner, and A.J. MacGregor.

In September 1919, Keracher participated in the founding of the American Communist Party in Chicago. However, unlike most of those who were joining the Communist Party at this time, Keracher did not believe in an imminent Communist Revolution in the United States. He also opposed the formation of radical "dual" labor unions and later emerged as an opponent of the Communist Party's exclusive reliance upon "underground" activity.

Keracher was arrested during the so-called Palmer Raids conducted nationwide on the night of January 2/3, 1920. Although many in the Justice Department continued to believe Keracher was deportable as a resident alien holding political views which ultimately advocated "force and violence," deportation proceedings against Keracher were terminated by the Bureau of Immigration of the Department of Labor in June 1920.

In January 1920, Keracher and his group of followers in Michigan (including those associated with the group who lived outside that state) were expelled from the Communist Party charged with "Menshevism," although Keracher himself continued to strongly support the Bolsheviks in Russia. Six months later, in June 1920, the Michigan group formed the Proletarian Party of America and Keracher remained the leader of the Proletarian Party for the rest of his life. As the Proletarian Party grew, local branches emerged in at least 38 U.S. cities.

Keracher moved from Detroit to Chicago in the early 1920s, the city where the Proletarian Party was thereafter based.

Death and legacy

In 1954, with his health beginning to fail, Keracher retired from the position of Executive Secretary of the Proletarian Party, passing on the mantle to his successor, Al Wysocki. Keracher moved to Los Angeles, where he remained active in party affairs.

Keracher died of a heart ailment on January 11, 1958. He was 77 years old at the time of his death.

The Proletarian Party formally disbanded in 1971.

See also

 Proletarian Party of America

Footnotes

Works

 Labor Saving Devices. Chicago: Proletarian Party, n.d. [1923].
 How the Gods Were Made (A Study in Historical Materialism). Chicago: Charles H. Kerr & Co., n.d. [1929].
 Economics for Beginners: Elementary Economics in Simple Language. Chicago, IL	Charles H. Kerr & Co. 	1935.
 Producers and Parasites. Chicago, IL	Charles H. Kerr & Co. 	1935.
 Why Unemployment? Chicago: Charles H. Kerr & Co., 1935.
 The Head-Fixing Industry. Chicago: Charles H. Kerr & Co., 1935. Revised and expanded second edition: 1955.
 Crime: Its Causes and Consequences. Chicago: Charles H. Kerr & Co., n.d. [1937].
 Frederick Engels (November 1820-August 1895). Chicago: Charles H. Kerr & Co., 1946.
 Wages and the Working Day. Chicago: Charles H. Kerr & Co, 1946.
 "We." Chicago: Proletarian Party of America, n.d. [c. 1946].  — leaflet.
 "Death of Al Renner," Proletarian News (Chicago), vol. 18, no. 9, whole no. 198 (Sept. 1949), pp. 2, 8.

Further reading

 Oakley C. Johnson, Marxism in United States History Before the Russian Revolution (1876–1917). New York: Humanities Press, 1974.
 "The Early Socialist Party of Michigan: An Assignment in Autobiography," Ann Arbor, MI: The Centennial Review, v. 10, no. 2 (Spring 1966), pp. 147–162.
 Allen Ruff, "We Called Each Other Comrade": Charles H. Kerr & Company, Radical Publishers. Urbana, IL: University of Illinois Press, 1997.

External links
 
 John Keracher Internet Archive, Marxists Internet Archive.
 Proletarian News. PDF issues, 1956-1961.

American communists
American Marxists
Members of the Communist Party USA
Scottish emigrants to the United States
1880 births
1958 deaths